24/7: The Passion of Life is a German film directed by Roland Reber. It was released in 2006.

Plot
Eva, A girl from a good family, accidentally meets Magdalena, another young woman; going to visit her at home, he discovers that she leads a double existence as a mistress. The protagonist is fascinated by the sensuality resulting from the BDSM culture.

External links
 
 24/7 The Passion of Life - Film Homepage

2005 films
German drama films
2000s German-language films
BDSM in films
2000s German films